The 2022 FIFA World Cup qualification CONCACAF–OFC play-off was a single-leg match between the fourth-placed team of the CONCACAF third round, Costa Rica, and the winners from the OFC, New Zealand. Before their identity was known, the winners of the play-off had already been allocated to Group E at the World Cup.

The match was played on 14 June 2022 at the Ahmad bin Ali Stadium in Al Rayyan, Qatar. Costa Rica won the match 1–0 to qualify for the 2022 FIFA World Cup in Qatar.

Background
The draw for the inter-confederation play-off fixtures was held on 26 November 2021.

Both teams had met once, a friendly won 4–0 by Costa Rica at the Ricardo Saprissa stadium on 24 March 2007. Current Costa Rican captain Bryan Ruiz, then 21 years old, scored a goal and gave an assist in that match. He is also the only player from that match to remain active with his national team. Current New Zealand's coach Danny Hay also played that match.

The match was the second inter-confederation play-off for Costa Rica, having previously lost 1–2 on aggregate to Uruguay in 2009. Since the OFC had no direct qualification spots, New Zealand reached the intercontinental play-offs for the fourth consecutive time, winning the first (against Bahrain in 2009) and losing the remaining two (against Mexico in 2013 and against Peru in 2017).

Costa Rica had a complicated start of the qualifying process. During the first half of the CONCACAF third round, Costa Rica stood fifth at only six points out of twenty-one, five points behind Panama, then the fourth-placed team. The second half of the round began on 16 November 2021; that night, as Costa Rica was drawing a home match against Honduras, their gap against the Panamanians almost increased to seven points; however, a late goal by Gerson Torres gave a crucial victory for the Ticos, who from then onwards enrolled in an unprecedented comeback, with six victories and one draw that saw them overtaking Panama, ending Canada's undefeated streak, and finishing fourth of the table, with only the goal difference preventing them to overtake the United States for the third place.

Marked by several delays due to effects of the COVID-19 pandemic such as travel restrictions that national teams couldn't be able to travel in those countries, the OFC qualification round announced the tournament scheduled to be held in Qatar in March 2022. New Zealand won the tournament and qualified to the play-off match against the CONCACAF fourth-placed team, who was unknown at the time.

The group stage draw took place on 1 April 2022, leaving the CONCACAF–OFC play-off winners allocated in Group E, alongside Spain, Japan, and Germany. Later, in May, FIFA revealed the stadium that would host both the AFC vs CONMEBOL and CONCACAF vs OFC play-off matches: the Ahmad bin Ali Stadium. The winners of the CONCACAF vs OFC play-off match are set to return to the stadium at the World Cup to face Japan on 27 November.

Match

Summary
Three minutes into the match, Joel Campbell received a cross from Jewison Bennette to score the lone goal. At the 39th minute, Chris Wood scored a goal after a poor clearance by Yeltsin Tejeda. However, his goal was nullified as the video assistant referee (VAR) showed that Matthew Garbett had fouled Óscar Duarte prior to the goal. The VAR was also used at the 69th minute, after Kosta Barbarouses, who had been subbed in just nine minutes prior, tackled Francisco Calvo's ankle. Referee Mohammed Abdulla Hassan Mohamed originally showed Barbarouses a yellow card, but after checking the VAR, Hassan changed it to a red card, leaving New Zealand down to ten men for the rest of the match.

The refereeing caused frustration in the New Zealand team. Coach Danny Hay said that "FIFA has let us down" because of the relative inexperience of the referees compared to the European officials for the Australia vs Peru match. Former Costa Rican referee Ramón Luis Méndez considered both the goal disallowance and the red card as valid decisions, but questioned why the VAR did not check a foul by Kendall Waston on Chris Wood that should have been a penalty.

Details

Man of the Match:
Keylor Navas (Costa Rica)

Notes

References

External links

Qualifiers, FIFA.com

FIFA World Cup qualification inter-confederation play-offs
World Cup qualification play-off
4
2021–22 in CONCACAF football
2021–22 in OFC football
Costa Rica national football team matches
New Zealand national football team matches
World Cup qualification play-off
FIFA World Cup play-off
International association football competitions hosted by Qatar
World Cup play-off
FIFA World Cup qualification
Sport in Al Rayyan
Costa Rica at the 2022 FIFA World Cup